Abrosovo is a rural locality (a village) in Nagornoye Rural Settlement, Petushinsky District, Vladimir Oblast, Russia. The population was 18 as of 2010. There is 1 street.

Geography 
Abrosovo is located 37 km northwest of Petushki (the district's administrative centre) by road. Yefimtsevo is the nearest rural locality.

References 

Rural localities in Petushinsky District
Pokrovsky Uyezd